Acanthogonatus juncal is a mygalomorph spider of Argentina and Chile, named after its type locality: Juncal, Los.

Andes.

Description
Female: total length ; cephalothorax length , width ; cephalic region length , width ; fovea width ; medial ocular quadrangle length , width ; labium length , width : sternum length , width . Its cephalic region is slightly convex, with a recurved fovea with a posterior median notch. Its labium possesses no cuspules. A serrula is present. Its sternal sigilla is small and oval; its sternum rebordered weakly. Chelicerae: rastellum is absent. Its cephalothorax, legs and palpi are a uniform yellowish brown colour; its venter is more pallid, while its dorsal abdomen is mottled.

Distribution
Juncal, Los Andes, Chile, a dry shrubland. Specimens were collected from small burrows at stone edges.

References

External links

 ADW entry

Pycnothelidae
Spiders of South America
Spiders described in 1995